The list of ship launches in 1851 includes a chronological list of some ships launched in 1851.


References

1851
Ship launches